Buford Lamar McGee (born August 16, 1960) is a former professional American football running back in the National Football League (NFL). He played nine seasons for the San Diego Chargers (1984–1986), the Los Angeles Rams (1987–1991) and the Green Bay Packers (1992). During his rookie season, McGee scored the winning touchdown on a 25-yard-run in overtime on November 18, 1984 as the Chargers defeated the 11–0 Miami Dolphins, 34–28.

References

1960 births
Living people
American football running backs
Green Bay Packers players
Los Angeles Rams players
Ole Miss Rebels football players
San Diego Chargers players
People from Durant, Mississippi
Players of American football from Mississippi